Applications Technology Satellite 3, or ATS-3, was a long-lived American experimental geostationary weather and communications satellite, operated by NASA from 1967 to 2001. It was at one time reputed to be the oldest satellite still in operation. , NASA referred to the ATS-3 as "The oldest active communications satellite by a wide margin."

On November 10, 1967, ATS-3 took NASA's first color photo (digital image mosaic) of the full-disk Earth, which was subsequently used on the cover of the first Whole Earth Catalog.

History
Launched in November 1967, the ATS-3 was in service for 11 years before finally being decommissioned in 1978 along with ATS-1. Among its widest-known achievements are the first full-disk, "true color" composite Earth image (DODGE took color-filtered black-and-white images, put together they produced the very first color image of the full-disk). Its imaging capability has served during disaster situations, from the Mexico earthquake to the Mount St. Helens eruption.

ATS-3 experiments included VHF and C-band communications, a color spin-scan camera (principally developed by Verner E. Suomi), an image dissector camera, a mechanically despun antenna, resistojet thrusters, hydrazine propulsion, optical surface experiments, and the measurement of the electron content of the ionosphere and magnetosphere.

Because of failures in the hydrogen peroxide systems on ATS-1, ATS-3 was equipped with a hydrazine propulsion system. Its success led to its incorporation on ATS-4 and ATS-5 as the sole propulsion system.

Operational details
The satellite has served as a communications link for rescue operations, including the 1985 Mexico City earthquake and the 1980 eruption of Mount St. Helens.

Circa 1970, ATS-3 was used to collect images of weather patterns, especially developing hurricanes in the Western Hemisphere. 1,200 line photos were downlinked, approximately every 25 minutes, during daylight hours to NOAA's Command and Data Acquisition Station at Wallops Station, Virginia and transferred to various users. The satellite was known for its spinning beam antennas locking up and rotating with the satellite. When that happened, it took a powerful ground-based transmitter, like the one at Mojave, to blast through digital instructions to get the antenna aimed back at earth again.

See also

 1967 in spaceflight
 First images of Earth from space
 Applications Technology Satellite

References

External links
 Information and tracking
 ATS-3 16 Year In Orbit Evaluation

Derelict satellites orbiting Earth
Communications satellites
Weather satellites of the United States
Spacecraft launched in 1967
Applications Technology Satellites